Shakespear may refer to:

 William Shakespeare, famous English playwright, as a variant spelling of his name

People
 Dorothy Shakespear (1886–1973), English artist
 Ethel Shakespear (1871–1946), English geologist, public servant and philanthropist
 Henry Shakespear Thuillier (1895–1982), British Army officer
 Hugh Shakespear Barnes (1853–1940), British administrator in India
 John Shakespear (1774–1858), English orientalist
 John Shakespear (British Army officer) (1861–1942), British Army officer in India
 Olivia Shakespear (1863–1938), British novelist and playwright
 Peter Shakespear (born1948), Australian rower
 Richmond Shakespear (1812–1861), Indian-born British Indian Army officer
 Ronald Shakespear (born 1941), Argentine graphic designer.
 William Shakespear (explorer) (1878–1915), British civil servant and explorer
 Wilma Shakespear (born 1943), Australian netball players

Other uses
 Shakespear Regional Park, a nature park at the tip of the Whangaparaoa Peninsula, New Zealand
 Shakespears Sister, a British pop-rock project

See also

 Shakespeare (disambiguation)